Fernhill Heath is a village in Worcestershire, England. It is in the civil parish of North Claines in Wychavon district.

Fernhill Heath is located on the A38 main road on the north-side of the City of Worcester and is approximately 3 miles north of Worcester and 3 miles south of Droitwich. The population of Fernhill Heath is around 3,000 people. The village features a public house called "The Bull", a sub-post office, 3 shops, a primary school, a Baptist church, a War Memorial Hall and a community centre.

Fernhill Heath railway station was closed in the 1960s, but may reopen as a parkway station.

One of the oldest properties within Fernhill Heath is Fernhill Heath House which was once owned and occupied by Lady Hindlip (Mrs Allsopp) who had moved into this as a widower upon the death of Lord Hindlip.  The house is now owned after extensive renovation 30 ish years ago by Richard Pearce. Agatha Hindlip donated money to the village upon her death to build a bowling green - however only the street name remaining Agatha Gardens.

Villages in Worcestershire
Wychavon